Pentti Malakias Antila (28 September 1926, in Lavia – 20 August 1997) was a Finnish agronomist, farmer and politician. He was a member of the Parliament of Finland, representing the Finnish Rural Party (SMP) from 1970 to 1972 and the Finnish People's Unity Party (SKYP) from 1972 to 1975.

References

1926 births
1997 deaths
People from Lavia, Finland
Finnish Rural Party politicians
Finnish People's Unity Party politicians
Members of the Parliament of Finland (1970–72)
Members of the Parliament of Finland (1972–75)